Achromatium is a genus in the phylum Pseudomonadota (Bacteria).

Etymology
The name Achromatium derives from:Greek prefix a- (ἄ), not; Greek noun chroma, color, paint; New Latin neuter gender noun Achromatium, that which is not colored.

Species
The genus contains  single species, namely A. oxaliferum ( Schewiakoff 1893, species. (Type species of the genus).; Latin oxalis from the Greek noun oxalis (ὀξαλίς), meaning sorrel, a toxic plant due to oxalic acid production; Latin v. fero, to carry; New Latin neuter gender adjective oxaliferum, oxalate-containing.

See also
 Bacterial taxonomy
 Microbiology

Notes

References 

Bacteria genera
Monotypic bacteria genera
Thiotrichales